WRXL-HD2 (102.1-2 FM) – branded Big 98.5 – is a digital subchannel of Richmond, Virginia radio station WRXL (102.1 FM). Owned by Audacy, Inc., WRXL-HD2 functions as a commercial country music radio station, serving Greater Richmond and much of surrounding Central Virginia. Using the proprietary technology HD Radio for its main digital transmission, WRXL-HD2 also rebroadcasts over low-power analog Glen Allen translator W253BI (98.5 FM), and streams online via Audacy. The WRXL-HD2 studios, and transmitters for both WRXL-HD2 and W253BI, reside in the Richmond suburb of Dumbarton.

History
In April 2013, Clear Channel Communications (now iHeartMedia) completed construction of the 98.5 FM translator in Glen Allen, Virginia. It was originally listed as a translator for WRVQ, which was later modified to use WTVR-FM.

On May 5, 2014, the station signed on as a simulcast of iHeartRadio's WRVA, using the branding "NewsRadio 1140 & 98.5 FM", and technically relaying WTVR-HD2. The simulcast ended on July 23, 2015, at 3pm, after the end of that day's Rush Limbaugh show.  The station then began stunting with construction noises, with liners telling WRVA listeners to move to 1140 AM, and to listen the following Monday, the 27th, at 9AM for something new on 98.5. At that time, 98.5 flipped to country as "Big 98.5", launching with 10,000 songs in a row. The first song on Big was "Kick the Dust Up" by Luke Bryan. As a translator is not legally permitted to originate its own programming, by U.S. Federal Communications Commission regulation, W253BI is relaying WRXL-HD2.

On November 1, 2017, iHeartMedia announced that WRXL-HD2/W253BI, along with all of their sister stations in Richmond and Chattanooga, will be sold to Entercom due to that company's merger with CBS Radio. The sale was completed on December 19, 2017.

FM Translator

References

External links

FM Translator
 
 

RXL-HD2
Country radio stations in the United States
Radio stations established in 2013
2013 establishments in Virginia
Audacy, Inc. radio stations